Eupithecia brunneomarginata is a moth in the family Geometridae. It is found in Pakistan.

The wingspan is about 17.5–19 mm. The forewings are pale grey with a darker, rusty brown terminal area. The hindwings are paler grey.

References

Moths described in 2008
brunneomarginata
Moths of Asia